Interstate 126 (I-126) is a spur route of I-26 entirely within the city limits of Columbia in the US state of South Carolina. It is entirely concurrent with U.S. Route 76 (US 76) and connects I-26 to Downtown Columbia. The Riverbanks Zoo is a major attraction on I-126.

Route description

I-126 begins in northwestern Columbia at an interchange with parent route I-26 and US 76 along the Saluda River. The terminus is located near the Dutch Square shopping center and I-26's own interchange with I-20, nicknamed "Malfunction Junction", which includes a weaving ramp from I-126's westbound lanes to I-20. The eight-lane freeway travels southeast along the Saluda River and passes the Riverbanks Zoo at Greystone Boulevard. It then crosses over the Broad River on the Timmerman Bridge near the mouth of the Saluda River. I-126 enters Downtown Columbia and reaches its easternmost interchange with Huger Street, which carries US 21, US 176, and US 321. The freeway continues east for several blocks on Elmwood Avenue, which carries the highways that Huger Street did, and ends at Gadsden Street near the South Carolina Governor's Mansion.

I-126 is officially named the Lester Bates Freeway for former Columbia mayor Lester Bates. All of its exits are unnumbered. The entire length of the freeway is concurrent with US 76, which continues west on I-26 towards Georgia and east to North Carolina.

History
Construction started on I-126 in 1959, and it was completed in 1961 as a four-lane freeway spur of I-26. The last sections of both freeways opened on May 16, 1961, as part of National Highway Week. In the early 1980s, it was widened to six lanes to from I-26 to Greystone Boulevard and eight lanes from there to Huger Street. By the 1990s, a lane was added eastbound from Colonial Life Boulevard to Greystone Boulevard and westbound from Greystone Boulevard to a new I-20 exit just before its western terminus. The eastern terminus of I-126 has fluctuated between Huger Street and Gadsden Street.

I-126 was designated the Lester Bates Freeway in April 1986 in honor of former Columbia mayor Lester Bates, who served three terms in the 1960s.

Future

I-20/I-26 interchange

The South Carolina Department of Transportation (SCDOT), in cooperation with the Federal Highway Administration (FHWA), is proposing improvements to the Interstate corridor of I-20/I-26/I-126, including the system interchanges at I-20/I-26 and I-26/I-126 in Lexington and Richland counties. These improvements are proposed to increase mobility and enhance traffic operations by reducing existing traffic congestion within the I-20/I-26/I-126 corridor, while accommodating future traffic needs.

Exit list
All exits are unnumbered.

Interstate 126 Business

Interstate 126 Business (I-126 Bus) was a boulevard-grade business spur of I-126 along Elmwood Avenue between Huger Street and Bull Street in concurrence with US 21/US 76/US 176/US 321. The route was never marked on state, county, or city highway maps. Signage proliferated along the westbound route in the late 1970s from Bull Street to Assembly Street. However, by 2000, only one sign remained, and this was gone by the mid-2000s. At some point, I-126 absorbed part of the business spur from Huger Street to Gadsden Street. It is considered decommissioned as no current state or federal maps list it nor does any physical signage exist.

See also

References

External links

 
 Mapmikey's South Carolina Highways Page: I-126

Transportation in Columbia, South Carolina
26-1
26-1
1
Transportation in Richland County, South Carolina